José Manuel Fuente Lavandera (September 30, 1945 in Limanes, Spain – July 18, 1996 in Oviedo, Spain) was a professional road racing cyclist and noted climbing specialist.

Fuente was a professional from 1970 to 1976. He had the same nickname as his father and grandfather, which was "El Tarangu", a word in the Asturian language for a man reputed for his strength and character. Fuente was known as one of the greatest climbers of his generation. He was a two-time winner of the Vuelta a España and won four consecutive climbers classification (or King of the Mountains) at the Giro d'Italia.  He was rivals with the great cyclists of his time: Eddy Merckx and Luis Ocaña. He won the Vuelta a España in 1972, which at that time was held in late April and early May. Several weeks later, in the 1972 Giro d'Italia, Fuente had a great battle with Eddy Merckx. Fuente took the pink jersey as leader of the general classification early on in the race but Merckx took it back. On the mountain stage to Bardonecchia, Fuente put in an attack that put pressure on Merckx. Little by little, Merckx increased his pace and came back to Fuente and ended up winning the stage. 

Health problems due to kidney disease forced Fuente to retire in 1975. After retirement he opened a successful cycle business in Oviedo and in 1988 was appointed directeur sportif of the CLAS team. This lasted only a year, after which he was replaced in 1989 by Juan Fernadez. Fuente died following a long battle with kidney disease at the age of 50.

Major results

1969 
 3rd Vuelta Asturias
1970
 1st Stage 9 Volta a Catalunya
 3rd Overall Vuelta a los Valles Mineros
1971
 Giro d'Italia
1st  Mountains classification
1st Stage 10
 Tour de France
1st Stages 14 & 15
1972
 1st  Overall Vuelta a España
1st  Mountains classification
1st  Combination classification
1st Stage 12
 2nd Overall Giro d'Italia
1st  Mountains classification
1st Stages 4a & 17
Held  after Stages 4a–6
1973
 1st  Overall Tour de Suisse
1st  Mountains classification
1st Stages 4 & 5
 2nd Overall Volta a la Comunitat Valenciana
 3rd Overall Tour de France
Held  after Stages 9–10
 8th Overall Giro d'Italia
1st  Mountains classification
1st Stage 19
1974
 1st  Overall Vuelta a España
1st Stages 9 & 13
 5th Overall Giro d'Italia
1st  Mountains classification
1st Stages 3, 9, 11a, 16 & 20
Held  after Stages 3–13
 8th Overall Tour of the Basque Country
1976
 1st Stage 3a Vuelta a los Valles Mineros

Grand Tour general classification results timeline

References

External links
Palmares of Jose Manuel Fuente

1945 births
1996 deaths
People from Siero
Cyclists from Asturias
Vuelta a España winners
Spanish Vuelta a España stage winners
Spanish Tour de France stage winners
Spanish Giro d'Italia stage winners
Tour de Suisse stage winners
Spanish male cyclists